Holy Name Cemetery is a Roman Catholic cemetery in Jersey City, New Jersey administered by the Roman Catholic Archdiocese of Newark. It was established in 1866 and at the end of calendar year 2002 has accepted 264,984 burials. It is an active cemetery providing services to Catholic families.

Notable burials

 James J. Donovan (1890–1971), Mayor of Bayonne, New Jersey 1939–43.
 Mark M. Fagan (1869–1955), Mayor of Jersey City, New Jersey
 Frank Hague (1876–1956), Mayor of Jersey City, New Jersey
 James Alphonsus Hamill (1877–1941), US Congressman
 Mickey Hughes (1866–1931), 19th-century Major League Baseball pitcher for the Brooklyn Bridegrooms.
 John Vincent Kenny (1894–1975), Mayor of Jersey City, New Jersey
 Michael McNamara (1839–1907), Marine Corps Medal of Honor recipient
 Mary Teresa Norton (1875–1959), served 13 consecutive terms in the United States House of Representatives, from 1925 to 1951
 Charles Francis Xavier O'Brien (1879–1940), US Congressman
 Thomas Francis Xavier Smith (1928–1996), Mayor of Jersey City, New Jersey
 Charles Stoneham (1876–1936), sports teams and racetrack owner
 Thomas James Tumulty (1913–1981), US Congressman

See also
 List of cemeteries in Hudson County, New Jersey

References

External links 
 
 Search for burials in the Archdiocese of Newark database
 Holy Name Cemetery at The Political Graveyard
 
 People Buried in Jersey City from Encyclopedia Titanica
 Holy Name Cemetery at Interment

Roman Catholic cemeteries in New Jersey
Roman Catholic Archdiocese of Newark
Cemeteries in Hudson County, New Jersey
Geography of Jersey City, New Jersey
1866 establishments in New Jersey